Annette is an album by Paul Bley with Franz Koglmann and Gary Peacock recorded in Germany in 1992 and released on the hat ART label in 1993. The album features compositions by Annette Peacock.

Reception 

The Independent review by Richard Williams noted "Bley has been exploring the likes of 'Blood', 'Touching' and 'Mister Joy' for most of his long career, but still manages to find something new within their strange, elliptical, allusive contours". Thom Jurek of AllMusic states, "With this album, the trio of Bley, Peacock, and Koglmann has created more than just a tribute to a great if nearly completely unknown artist -- it has offered a look deep inside the musical psyche of a true original".
The Guardian review by John Fordham awarded the album 3 stars observing "Bley's unplugged trio – with Austrian trumpeter Franz Koglmann and Annette Peacock's first husband Gary Peacock on bass – doesn't mimic or cover its subject's work. Instead, it takes up the free-improv invitation of her melancholy, minor-key miniatures... Peacock's avant-pop connections, however, shouldn't fool anyone into thinking this is anything other than a mostly low-key, acoustic free-jazz conversation".

Track listing 
All compositions by Annette Peacock except as indicated
 "Touching (Take 1)" – 5:51
 "El Cordobes" – 8:31
 "Cartoon" – 6:26
 "Albert's Love Theme" – 3:46
 "Kid Dynamite" – 4:26
 "Miracles" – 6:47
 "Blood (Take 1)" – 5:03
 "Annette" (Paul Bley, Gary Peacock, Franz Koglmann) – 6:26
 "Both" – 4:26
 "Blood (Take 2)" – 2:46
 "Mister Joy" – 8:37
 "Touching (Take 2)" – 1:45

Personnel 
Paul Bley – piano
Franz Koglmann – trumpet, flugelhorn
Gary Peacock – bass

References 

1993 albums
Paul Bley albums
Franz Koglmann albums
Hathut Records albums